Mars/Venus is the only studio album by American contemporary R&B duo Koffee Brown, released on March 6, 2001 through Arista Records.

The album, which featured production from Kay Gee and Darren Lighty, was a moderate success, charting in the top 40 on the U.S. Billboard 200, peaking at 32, though it found greater success on the Billboard's Top R&B/Hip-Hop Albums, where it peaked at 7. The album's lead single "After Party" also found success on the U.S. charts, peaking at 44 on the Billboard Hot 100. Despite success with both the single and album, Koffee Brown disbanded shortly after the album's release.

Track listing
"Intro" - :25 
"Weekend Thing" (featuring B-12) - 3:23  
"After Party" - 3:34
"Didn't Mean to Turn You On" (featuring Du-Ganz) - 4:13  
"Chick on da Side" - 3:56  
"Fingerpointing" - 4:24  
"Blackout" (featuring Lady Luck) - 4:02  
"All I Need (Bonnie and Clyde)" (featuring Du-Ganz) - 3:36  
"All Those Fancy Things" - 3:34  
"Quickie" - 3:54  
"The View" - 1:46  
"I Got Love (Scars)" - 3:07  
"Hater's Disease" - 4:13  
"Qualified" - 3:52  
"Mars/Venus" - 1:12
"Do U See" - 3:48

Charts

2001 debut albums
Arista Records albums
Neo soul albums
Contemporary R&B albums by American artists